Olds (Netook) Airport  is located  north of Olds, Alberta, Canada. The airport is owned and operated by the Air Cadet League of Canada Alberta Provincial Committee. It is home to the Netook Gliding Centre, one of five Air Cadet Gliding Program locations in Alberta.

History
The airfield was built in 1941 by the Royal Canadian Air Force as part of the British Commonwealth Air Training Plan, and served as a relief field for No. 32 Elementary Flying Training School at Bowden, Alberta.

Aerodrome
The Aerodrome was listed as "turf" and "all way field." There is no dimensional data and the field was drawn as a rough square along the Canadian Pacific Railway line.

See also
Olds-Didsbury Airport

References

External links
Place to Fly on COPA's Places to Fly airport directory

Registered aerodromes in Alberta
Mountain View County